Thomas Boyd McKillop (27 October 1917 – February 1984) was a Scottish footballer who played for Rangers, winning the Scottish Football League title on two occasions with the Govan club (1936–37 and 1938–39). His football career was then interrupted by the Second World War, during which he served in the British Army. At the end of the war, he accepted an invitation from William Reaside to play in Mexico, alongside Jackie Milne and Jimmy Hickie. He then moved to Wales to play for Rhyl, and later managed the club. His daughter Liz was raised in Wales, but was later a prominent civil servant in Scotland during the 1990s.

McKillop represented Scotland once, in a 3–1 victory against Netherlands in May 1938.

References

External links

1917 births
1984 deaths
Scottish footballers
Footballers from Irvine, North Ayrshire
Rangers F.C. players
Portsmouth F.C. wartime guest players
Arsenal F.C. wartime guest players
Birmingham City F.C. wartime guest players
Rhyl F.C. players
Scottish Football League players
Scottish Junior Football Association players
Scotland international footballers
British Army personnel of World War II
Association football wing halves
Scottish expatriate footballers
Scottish expatriate sportspeople in Mexico
Expatriate footballers in Mexico
Liga MX players
Asturias F.C. players
Scottish football managers
Rhyl F.C. managers